The Del Mar Oaks is an American Thoroughbred horse race run annually in mid August at the Del Mar Racetrack in Del Mar, California. Open to three-year-old fillies, it is contested at a distance of one and one-eighth miles (9 furlongs) on the turf. Since 1994 it has been a Grade I event.

From its inception in 1957 through 1964, the Del Mar Oaks was raced at a distance of one mile on dirt.

It was raced in two divisions in 1966 and again in 1970.

Records
Speed  record: (at current distance of  miles)
 1:46.26 – Amorama (2004)

Most wins by an owner:
 4 – Howard B. Keck (1970, 1971, 1975, 1986)

Most wins by a jockey:
 4 – Bill Shoemaker (1970, 1971, 1985, 1986)
 4 – Chris McCarron (1979, 1984, 1989, 1991)
 4 – Corey Nakatani (1998, 2003, 2007, 2014)

Most wins by a trainer:
 7 – Charlie Whittingham (1970, 1971, 1975, 1979, 1982, 1986, 1991)

Winners

References
 Del Mar Oaks details at Del Mar website
 The 2008 Del Mar Oaks at the NTRA

Turf races in the United States
Flat horse races for three-year-old fillies
Grade 1 stakes races in the United States
Horse races in California
Recurring sporting events established in 1957
Del Mar Racetrack
1957 establishments in California